The Rochester Basin, at , is the deepest part of Lake Ontario. The lake bottom of the Rochester Basin is strongly marked by glaciation, with parallel gouges and underwater drumlins.

References

Lake Ontario